Luke Joseph Stringer (born ) is a South African rugby union player for SC Albi in the Narionale League in France.His regular position is flank or eighth man.

References

South African rugby union players
Living people
1995 births
Rugby union players from Cape Town
South African people of English descent
Rugby union flankers
Rugby union number eights
Sharks (Currie Cup) players
Western Province (rugby union) players
White South African people
US Montauban players